Ibrahim Meite (born 29 July 1996) is an English former professional footballer who played as a striker.

Career
Meite was born to Ivorian parents and raised in a council estate in Roehampton, London Borough of Wandsworth. After playing for AG Academy and Harrow Borough, Meite trialled with Leicester City (in October 2016) and Cardiff City (in December 2016). He turned professional with Cardiff City in January 2017, making his debut for the club as a substitute in place of Craig Noone during a 0–0 draw with Wigan Athletic on 22 April 2017.

On 25 August 2017, Meite joined League Two side Crawley Town on loan until January 2018.

After being released by Cardiff, Meite returned to Crawley on a permanent deal in February 2019.

On 3 August 2019 it was announced that Meite would be joining National League side Woking on a one-month loan. The loan was extended for a further month on 2 September 2019, which was then extended again on 4 October 2019 until 30 January 2020. On 4 March 2020, Meite then joined Bulgarian Second Professional Football League side Pirin Blagoevgrad on loan until the end of the season.

He was released by Crawley at the end of the 2019–20 season.

In July 2020, Meite joined League of Ireland Premier Division side Derry City on a deal until the end of the 2020 season. Meite later left the club in December, following just 11 appearances all season.

On 27 August 2021, Meite signed for Isthmian League Premier Division side, Wingate & Finchley and went onto score on his debut during a 4–1 away defeat to Haringey Borough.

Personal life 
In January 2018, Meite was charged with drink-driving at Brighton Magistrates' Court, following a speeding offence in Hove on 31 December 2017. He was banned from driving for 17 months and made to pay a £380 fine plus £85 costs and £38 victim surcharge.

In July 2020 he was charged with stabbing a man in September 2019 in Putney. In early 2022 he went on trial, accused of stabbing a man in the back in a "premeditated and not provoked attack" in a London street. In the same incident he was also stabbed running away by the person he was alleged to have stabbed.

On 15 December 2022, Meite was sentenced to 15 months in prison.

Career statistics

References

1996 births
Living people
English footballers
Association football forwards
Harrow Borough F.C. players
Cardiff City F.C. players
Crawley Town F.C. players
Woking F.C. players
OFC Pirin Blagoevgrad players
Derry City F.C. players
Wingate & Finchley F.C. players
Isthmian League players
English Football League players
National League (English football) players
Second Professional Football League (Bulgaria) players
Expatriate footballers in Bulgaria
English people of Ivorian descent
Footballers from Roehampton
Black British sportspeople
English expatriate sportspeople in Bulgaria
English expatriate footballers